The Portland ePrix is a future race of the FIA Formula E World Championship, an all-electric single-seater racing series. The race will be held at the Portland International Raceway for the first time on June 24th, 2023.

History
After construction in the Red Hook area of Brooklyn caused the New York City ePrix to be taken off the calendar for 2023, Formula E signed a deal with the City of Portland and PIR in order to keep the American interest in Formula E alive over the stop-gap period in New York. FE co-founder Alberto Longo said that the Portland motorsports fanbase and the city's "ecological credentials" were vital in choosing the city to play host to Formula E. The ePrix will be the first of its kind in the Pacific Northwest, the first ePrix on the US West Coast since the 2015 Long Beach ePrix, and the fourth United States ePrix following Long Beach, NYC, and the Miami ePrix.

Circuit

The Portland International Raceway will be home to the event. It is unclear whether or not the circuit will be modified for the Formula E event (just as fellow permanent circuit Valencia did in Season 7). With the ePrix debuting in 2023, this will mark the third major auto race held at PIR alongside IndyCar's Grand Prix of Portland and the NASCAR Xfinity Series Pacific Office Automation 147, with all three races promoted by Green Savoree Racing Promotions.

References 

Formula E ePrix
Auto races in the United States
Sports competitions in Oregon
Recurring sporting events established in 2023
2023 establishments in Oregon
Sports in Portland, Oregon
Annual events in Portland, Oregon